Algo más may refer to:

"Algo Más" (Camilo Sesto song), 1973
"Algo Más" (La 5ª Estación song), 2004
Algo más (es),  1973 album  Camilo Sesto
Algo más (es),  1983 album   Los Secretos